Signature Island is a luxury development project in the Bandra Kurla Complex, Mumbai, India. Built by Sunteck Realty Limited, the project features all duplex homes of 7,500 and 11,500 square feet. The project was completed in 2015.

In 2013, Signature Island was named Project of the year at the 27th National Real Estate Awards. In 2014 it won 2 awards at the Realty Plus Excellence Awards. In 2015 it was named Luxury Project of the Year by Lokmat.

Notable residents
 Aishwarya Rai Bachchan and Abhishek Bachchan
 Sonam K Ahuja
Rinke Khanna
Vikram Pandit
Nimesh Kampani
Uday Kotak

References

Buildings and structures in Mumbai